Shea Gopaul is the Special Representative to the United Nations in New York for the International Organisation of Employers (IOE). She is also the Founder and former Executive Director Emeritus of the Global Apprenticeship Network (GAN), a coalition of companies and organizations addressing the skills mismatch and youth unemployment. 

In her role as the Special Representative to the UN, Gopaul ensures the voice of business is heard at the UN table. She is the co-chair of the UN Business and Industry Major Group and represents business perspectives on various committees. She is leading an initiative on inclusive multilateralism which tries to enhance private sector engagement and partnerships with several UN entities. Through dialogues, publications, outreach and communications projects, the initiative seeks to stimulate collaboration and foster partnerships between the public and private sectors to Build Back Better from COVID-19 and achieve the Sustainable Development Goals (SDGs).

Education

Shea Gopaul holds a Master's degree in International Education from Teacher's College, Columbia University, is an Institute for the Study of Labor Policy Fellow, and a recipient of an Honorary Doctorate in Humane Letters and undergraduate degree from Point Park University.  

An accomplished classical ballet dancer, she remains active in the art world and is on the board of directors of Battery Dance Company in New York, which uses dance to foster intercultural exchange and understanding.

Publications

Shea Gopaul led the preparation of a joint publication by the International Organisation of Employers (IOE), the Konrad Adenauer Stiftung (KAS) office in New York, and the UN Development Coordination Office (DCO) titled Playbook: Building Momentum in the Decade of Action through Collaboration between Employers and UN Resident Coordination. The Playbook aims to strengthen the dialogue and collaboration between Resident Coordinators (RCs) and employer organisations with the purpose of working together to achieve the Sustainable Development Goals (SDGs). The Playbook provides RCs and employer organisations a guide with recommendations, best practices, useful tips on collaboration, and outlining roles and responsibilities.

In early 2013, Shea Gopaul led and authored an International Labour Organization (ILO) feasibility study to gather information from businesses about their apprenticeship programs and to seek their views on how an international business network on apprenticeships could add value for them. In collaboration with the International Organisation of Employers (IOE) and members of the World Economic Forum’s Global Agenda Council on Youth Unemployment, the feasibility study collected information from multi-stakeholders on country and company apprenticeship practices; and, explored the interest and eventual commitment of companies to join forces to promote apprenticeship through a Global Apprenticeships Network. Shea Gopaul has coauthored several articles on apprenticeships, jobs, and other reskilling programs. She has been a regular voice on youth training at Davos and other B20 programs.

References

Living people
Public–private partnership
21st-century American women writers
Organization founders
Nationality missing
Year of birth missing (living people)